The Ngamba were an Australian Aboriginal people of New South Wales.

Language
The Ngamba language is poorly described because little has been transmitted of its nature. It is generally believed to have been similar to Gumbaynggirr.

Country
The inland extension has not been ascertained.

People
A few remnants of the original tribe were attested as still living in 1929, when A.R. Radcliffe-Brown described them as lingering on with descendants of the Ngaku and Daingatti. According to the reminiscences of Harry Buchanan, they had been systematically and savagely exterminated by the Australian native police.

Customs
The Ngamba exploited the mangrove species Avicennia marina for its bark in order to fashion their military shields.

Alternative names
 Ngambar
 Ngeunbah

Notes

Citations

Sources

Aboriginal peoples of New South Wales